Ault, (also known as Gowkstown), is a townland of 367 acres in County Antrim, Northern Ireland. It is situated in the civil parish of Tickmacrevan and the historic barony of Glenarm Lower.

The townland contains a Wedge tomb (Giant’s Grave) registered as a Scheduled Historic Monument at grid ref: D3161 1082. The wedge tomb is set in a long cairn aligned south-west/north-east, with a single large burial chamber and small antechamber. The antechamber has a straight stone facade and the burial chamber is formed from a number of large stones, with one lintel stone in place. There is an outer kerb of closely spaced boulders (with over 25 stones in place) and the space between the kerb and the burial chamber is filled with cairn material.

See also 
List of townlands in County Antrim
List of places in County Antrim

References

Townlands of County Antrim
Civil parish of Tickmacrevan
Archaeological sites in County Antrim